La casa de la Troya ("The House of Troy") is a 1948 Mexican film based on Alejandro Pérez Lugín's novel of the same name. It stars Armando Calvo, Rosario Granados, Ángel Garasa and Luis Alcoriza.

External links
 

1948 films
1940s Spanish-language films
Films based on works by Alejandro Pérez Lugín
Mexican black-and-white films
Mexican drama films
1948 drama films
1940s Mexican films